Hijos de Rivera, S.A. is a Spanish brewery founded in 1906 in the city of A Coruña, Galicia. The main brand is Estrella Galicia, a 5.5% abv pale lager.

History
The company's origins date back to 1906 when José María Rivera Corral established La Estrella de Galicia brewery in the city of A Coruña.

In 2006, the company celebrated its centenary in the company of King Juan Carlos. A beer named 1906 Reserva Especial was launched to commemorate the occasion. In 2017, the company purchased a 32% stake in Carlow Brewing Company, an Irish-based brewery.

In 2022, he transformed his online store into a marketplace, called BigCrafters, to promote the sale of its own and third-party artisan products.

Brands

 Estrella Galicia Cerveza de Bodega (no pasteurization)
 Estrella Galicia Cerveza Especial
 Estrella Galicia Cerveza Especial Sin Gluten (no gluten)
 Estrella Galicia 0,0 (no alcohol)
 La Estrella de Galicia
 Estrella de Navidad
 Shandy Estrella Galicia (with lemon)
 1906 Reserva Especial
 1906 Red Vintage
 1906 Black Coupage
 1906 Galician Irish Red Ale
 Agua de Cabreiroa 
 Agua de Cuevas
 Agua Fontarel
 Sidra Maeloc

Notes
1. Sons of Rivera

References

External links
Estrella Galicia web site
1906

Food and drink companies established in 1906
Companies based in Galicia (Spain)
Beer in Spain
Spanish companies established in 1906